Yngve Lindgren, born 26 April 1912, dead 9 April 1990, was a Swedish footballer. He played for Örgryte IS.

References

Swedish footballers
Allsvenskan players
Örgryte IS players
Association football forwards